Timothy Ravinder Dev Pradeep  is the Bishop in Coimbatore Diocese of Church of South India.

Early years

Timothy Ravinder Dev Pradeep was born in 1958 to S. Timothy and Emily Jane and was brought up in Ketti, a small village south of Ooty, The Nilgiris, South India. He had completed his primary education from The Laidlaw Memorial School of St. George's Homes, Ketti. He had taken the Pre University Course from Kongunadu Arts and Science College, Coimbatore. He did his graduate course in B.Sc. Physics from University of Madras from Sri Ramakrishna Mission Vidyalaya.  He successfully completed the theological degree B.D. from the United Theological College, Bangalore, India (1991 to 1996). Subsequent to this he was selected to take an autumn course in New Testament studies at the Copenhagen University in Denmark. In the year 2003 Timothy Ravinder was deputed by the Church of South India from the Coimbatore diocese to work with the Protestant Church in Baden, Germany from 2003 to 2008 where he further studied German Language, Arts and Culture at the Frankfurt University under the European Language Course Certificate in Rheinfelden, Baden.

Timothy Ravinder Dev Pradeep is married to Anny Hemalatha. He has two children.

Bishopric
Timothy Ravinder Dev Pradeep was consecrated as the 6th bishop in Coimbatore Diocese of the Church of South India on 28 September 2013 by Most Rev Devakadasham, Moderator, Church of South India.

References

Living people
Church of South India clergy
1958 births
Anglican bishops of Coimbatore